Malaysia competed in the 1965 Southeast Asian Peninsular Games as the host nation in Kuala Lumpur from 14 to 21 December 1965.

Medal summary

Medals by sport

Medallists

References

1965